The Steve Sexton Mile Stakes is a Grade III American Thoroughbred horse race for horses three years old and older over the distance of one mile (8 furlongs on the dirt scheduled annually in late May at Lone Star Park in Grand Prairie, Texas.

History
The inaugural running of the event was on 20 April in 1997 as the Texas Mile Stakes and was won by Isitingood who was trained by the US Hall of Fame trainer Bob Baffert and owned by Michael E. Pegram & Terry Henn in a time of 1:34.44. The winning time continues to this day to be the stakes record.
 
After being classified as a Listed event in 1999 it became the first graded Thoroughbred stakes race in Texas.

In 2001, Dixie Dot Com became the only horse to win in the same year the Texas Mile and the Lone Star Park Handicap, known as "The Texas Two Step."

Among notable horses who ran in the Texas Mile but did not win were Skip Away, who finished third in 1997, and Real Quiet who finished second in 1999.

Beginning with the 2017 running, the race was renamed to honor Steve Sexton, a member of Lone Star Park's original management team who had died the previous year. Sexton also oversaw Churchill Downs from 2002-2009 and was the 12th president in the track's history. Sexton, an executive vice-president with Churchill Downs Inc., also served as president of Churchill Downs Entertainment Group following his time as track president.

In 2020 due to the COVID-19 pandemic in the United States, Lone Star Park did not schedule the event in their updated and shortened spring-summer meeting.

Records
Speed record:
1:34.44 - Isitingood (1997) (stakes and track record)

Margins:
 8 lengths - Monterey Jazz (2008)

Most wins:
 2 - Littlebitlively (1998, 1999)

Most wins by a jockey:
 3 - David Flores (1997, 2001, 2008)

Most wins by a trainer:
 4 - Steven M. Asmussen (2011, 2013, 2018, 2022)
 4 - Bob Baffert (1997, 2006, 2010, 2017)

Most wins by an owner:
 2 - Mike Pegram (1997, 2006)
 2 - John A. Franks (1998, 1999)

Winners

See also
List of American and Canadian Graded races

References

Graded stakes races in the United States
Open mile category horse races
1997 establishments in Texas
Recurring sporting events established in 1997
Horse races in Texas
Grade 3 stakes races in the United States